Turk or Turks may refer to:

Communities and ethnic groups 
 Turkic peoples, a collection of ethnic groups who speak Turkic languages
 Turkish people, or the Turks, a Turkic ethnic group and nation
 Turkish citizen, a citizen of the Republic of Turkey
 Turks, reference to the Ottoman Empire
 Turks (term for Christians), the name given to the Horse-archer Christian unit in the Crusader army.
 Turks (term for Muslims), used by Turks and British people and the non-Muslim Balkan peoples to denote all Muslim settlers in the region
 Turk (caste), Indo-Turkic people in India. 
 Turks of South Carolina, in the United States, a group of people
 a nickname for inhabitants of Faymonville, Liège, Belgium
 a nickname for inhabitants of Llanelli, Carmarthenshire, Wales

People 
 Turk (surname), a list of people with the name
 Turk (nickname), a list of people with the nickname
 Turk (rapper) (Tab Virgil Jr., born 1981), an American rapper
 Philippe Liégeois (born 1947), pen name "Turk", a Belgian comic book artist
 Al-Turk, a list of people with the name

Places 
 Brig o' Turk, a small rural village in Scotland
 Turks Islands, part of the Turks and Caicos Islands, in the West Indies
 Turk Site, an archaeological site in Kentucky, U.S.

Arts and entertainment

Fictional entities
 Turks (Final Fantasy VII), in the video game Final Fantasy VII 
 Turks, a motorcycle club in 1985 film Mask
 Christopher Turk, in the TV series Scrubs
 Turkish, in 2000 film Snatch (film) 
 Turk Barrett, in Marvel comics
 Terry Lynch, in the 1985 film Turk 182 
 The Turk, a chess computer from TV series Terminator: The Sarah Connor Chronicles, and the title of an episode

Works
 The Turk (play), by John Mason, 1610
 "Turk", by High on Fire, from their 2007 album Death Is This Communion
 Turks (TV series), a 1999 American police drama 
 "Turks" (song), by Nav and Gunna, 2020

See also 
 
 Grand Turk (disambiguation)
 Turkey (disambiguation)
 Turkish (disambiguation)
 Turk's Head (disambiguation)
 Turck (disambiguation)
 Turku, a city in Finland
 Maumturks, a mountain range in Ireland
 Mechanical Turk, an 18th century fake chess-playing machine 
 Amazon Mechanical Turk, a crowdsourcing website

Language and nationality disambiguation pages